Baron Prášil is a Czech comedy film directed by Martin Frič. It was released in 1940.

Cast
 Vlasta Burian as Baron Archibald Prásil
 Antonin Mikulic as Pepik
 Meda Valentová as Baroness Olga
 Zorka Průcha as Countess Carla
 Anna Steimarová as Aunt Emma
 Oldřich Nový as Arnost Benda
 Jaroslav Marvan as Bedrich Emanuel Benda
 Ella Nollová as Marie Bendova
 Čeněk Šlégl as Count Bohdan Kocharowski
 Frantisek Roland as Ronald
 Václav Trégl as Patocia
 Theodor Pištěk as Entertainer
 František Filipovský as Waiter
 Karel Postranecký as Hunter

References

External links
 

1940 films
1940 comedy films
Baron Munchausen
1940s Czech-language films
Czech black-and-white films
Films directed by Martin Frič
Czech comedy films
1940s Czech films